WFWL (1220 AM, "The Catfish") was a radio station broadcasting a country music format. Licensed to Camden, Tennessee, United States, the station was owned by Community Broadcasting Services, Inc. and featured programming from Citadel Media.

In November 2021, the station announced that it would cease operations on December 1, 2021, after 65 years on the air.

On June 3, 2022, Community Broadcasting Services surrendered WFWL's license to the Federal Communications Commission and the license was cancelled. Due to that, W259BN started simulcasting WRJB.

References

External links
FCC History Cards for WFWL (covering 1956-1979)
FCC Station Search Details: DWFWL (Facility ID: 4801)

FWL
Defunct radio stations in the United States
Radio stations established in 1956
1956 establishments in Tennessee
Radio stations disestablished in 2022
2022 disestablishments in Tennessee
FWL